Steven M. Nadler (born November 11, 1958) is an American academic and philosopher specializing in early modern philosophy. He is Vilas Research Professor and the William H. Hay II Professor of Philosophy, and (from 2004–2009) Max and Frieda Weinstein-Bascom Professor of Jewish Studies at the University of Wisconsin–Madison.

Education and career
Nadler received his B.A. from Washington University in St. Louis in 1980 and his M.A. and Ph.D. from Columbia University in 1981 and 1986. He has taught at the University of Wisconsin–Madison since 1988 and has been a visiting professor of philosophy at Stanford University, the University of Chicago, the Ecole des hautes études en sciences sociales in Paris, the École normale supérieure-Paris, and the University of Amsterdam.

In November, 2006, he presented at the Beyond Belief: Science, Religion, Reason and Survival symposium. In 2007, he held the Spinoza Chair at the University of Amsterdam.

From 2010–2015 he was the editor of the Journal of the History of Philosophy.

In April 2015, he was a Scholar in Residence at the American Academy in Rome. Also in 2015 he was invited to sit on an advisory board at a symposium held by the Amsterdam Talmud Torah congregation to discuss the lifting of the cherem on 17th-century Jewish philosopher Baruch Spinoza, which had been imposed in 1656 on account of his views on the God of the Torah, which were condemned as heretical.

Recognition
In 2020 he was elected a Fellow of the American Academy of Arts and Sciences.

Philosophical work

His research focus has been devoted to the study of philosophy in the seventeenth century, including Descartes and Cartesian philosophy, Spinoza, and Leibniz. His research also includes antecedents of aspects of early modern thought in medieval Latin philosophy and (especially with respect to Spinoza) medieval Jewish philosophy.

Selected publications

Books 

 

Editor, 
 Editor, Causation in Early Modern Philosophy (Penn State Press, 1993) 
 Spinoza:  A Life (Cambridge University Press, 1999) - Winner of the 2000 Koret Jewish Book Award . Second edition published in 2018.
 Editor, The Cambridge Companion to Malebranche (Cambridge University Press, 2000) 
 Editor, A Companion to Early Modern Philosophy (Blackwell, 2002) 
 Spinoza's Heresy:  Immortality and the Jewish Mind (Oxford, 2002) 
 Rembrandt's Jews (University of Chicago Press, 2003) - Finalist for the Pulitzer Prize for General Non-Fiction in 2004. 
 Co-editor (with Manfred Walther and Elhanan Yakira), Spinoza and Jewish Identity (Konigshausen & Neumann, 2003) 
 Co-editor (with Daniel Garber), Oxford Studies in Early Modern Philosophy (Oxford University Press, 2006) 
 Spinoza's Ethics:  An Introduction (Cambridge, 2006) 
 The Best of All Possible Worlds:  A Story of Philosophers, God, and Evil (Farrar, Straus & Giroux, 2008; paperback, Princeton University Press, 2010)
 A Book Forged in Hell: Spinoza's Scandalous Treatise and the Birth of the Secular Age (Princeton University Press, 2011)
 The Philosopher, the Priest, and the Painter: A Portrait of Descartes (Princeton University Press, 2013)
 Editor, Spinoza and Medieval Jewish Philosophy (Cambridge University Press, 2014)
 Editor and Translator of Géraud de Cordemoy, Six Discourses on the Distinction Between the Body and the Soul and Discourses on Metaphysics (Oxford University Press, 2015)
 With Ben Nadler, illustrator: Heretics! The Wondrous (and Dangerous) Beginnings of Modern Philosophy (Princeton University Press, 2017)
 Menasseh ben Israel: Rabbi of Amsterdam (Yale University Press, 2018) Jewish Lives Series
 Spinoza: A Life (Cambridge University Press, 2nd edition, 2018)
 Think Least of Death: Spinoza on How to Live and How to Die (Princeton University Press, 2020)
 The Portraitist: Frans Hals and His World (University of Chicago Press, 2022)
 Descartes: The Renewal of Philosophy (Reaktion Books, 2023)

Book reviews

Essays

See also 
 Philosophy of Spinoza

References

External links 

Personal website
Steven Nadler at UW
 Interview on Spinoza

1958 births
20th-century American philosophers
21st-century American philosophers
Academic journal editors
American philosophy academics
Columbia University alumni
Jewish American academics
Jewish philosophers
Judaic scholars
Living people
Presidents of the American Philosophical Association
Spinoza scholars
Spinozists
The Times Literary Supplement people
University of Wisconsin–Madison faculty
Washington University in St. Louis alumni
Academic staff of the University of Amsterdam
Academic staff of the School for Advanced Studies in the Social Sciences